Note: This ship should not be confused with USS Dawn (SP-26), which was in commission during the same era.

USS Dawn (SP-37) was the proposed designation for a patrol boat that never actually served in the United States Navy.

Dawn was a private yawl built in 1916 by the F.C. Adams Shipbuilding Company at Booth Bay, Maine. On 14 May 1917, the U.S. Navy ordered her owner, Franklin Farrel Jr. of New Haven, Connecticut, to deliver her to the Navy for service as a patrol boat in World War I, and she was registered accordingly with the naval section patrol designation SP-37. However, the Navy cancelled its lease for her in June 1917 and returned her to Farrel in December 1917 without commissioning her.

References
NavSource Online: Section Patrol Craft Photo Archive Dawn (SP 37)

Cancelled ships of the United States Navy
Patrol vessels of the United States Navy
World War I patrol vessels of the United States
Ships built in Boothbay, Maine
1916 ships